Pavel Khadasevich (born 16 July 1993) is a Belarusian Olympic weightlifter and Olympian competing in the 85 kg category until 2018 and 89 kg starting in 2018 after the International Weightlifting Federation reorganized the categories.

Career
He competed at the 2016 Summer Olympics in the 85 kg category, originally finishing 7th, but was upgraded to 6th after the original bronze medalist Gabriel Sîncrăian failed a drug test in October of that year.

Major results

References

External links
 
 
 

1993 births
Living people
Belarusian male weightlifters
Weightlifters at the 2016 Summer Olympics
Olympic weightlifters of Belarus
World Weightlifting Championships medalists